Paysage au bord du Lez (Landscape on the banks of the Lez) is an oil-on-canvas landscape painting by the 19th century French impressionist artist Frédéric Bazille,  completed in 1870. It is the collection of the Minneapolis Institute of Arts.

Overview
This painting is Bazille's last known completed work. In June 1870, Bazille wrote in a letter to his father “I have just about finished a large landscape (eclogue).”   The Franco-Prussian War erupted only two weeks later, and Bazille volunteered for service in a Zouave regiment in August. On November 28 of the same year, he was with his unit at the Battle of Beaune-la-Rolande when, his commanding officer having been injured, he took command and led an assault on the Prussian positions. He was hit twice in the failed attack and was killed in action at the age of twenty-eight.

Paysage au bord du Lez''' is the “large landscape” referred in Bazille's letter to his father. In his letter, he specifically uses the word “eclogue”, which is using defined as a poem in a classical style on a pastoral subject. In terms of painting, this implies an image of rustic figures conversing in an Arcadian landscape. However, Bazille's painting, while showing the bucolic sun-drenched and dry landscapes near his native Montpellier, is devoid of figures or any sign of human activity aside from a narrow meandering footpath. The Lez River, the main river of Montpellier, is only hinted at by a very thin pale line towards the center of the image, and the forested gully to the right.

See also
List of paintings by Frédéric Bazille

References
Pitman, Dianne W. (1998). Bazille: Purity, Pose and Painting in the 1860s.'' University Park: Penn State University Press. .

Notes 

1870 paintings
Paintings by Frédéric Bazille
Landscape paintings